Frankie Quiñones is a Mexican American stand-up comedian and actor from Los Angeles best known for his role as 'Creeper' in the sketch comedy webseries CholoFit and his supporting role in Hulu's This Fool.

Early life 
He grew up watching comedy shows such as In Living Color, Culture Clash, and Saturday Night Live, and became the family comedian, using a sprinkler head as a stand-in for a microphone. He created characters that were rooted in his Latino upbringing.

Career 
He gained some recognition for his web series Juanita Carmelita, a character he created based on his mother's personality. Yet, his character 'Creeper' based on his father's cholo style and attitude went viral with his CholoFit sketch, appearing in numerous popular videos. With the popularity of the web series, Quiñones also did more stand-up routines at major venues, including The Wiltern and Fox Theater.

In 2021, he hosted a comedy sketch show on HBO Max Frankie Quiñones: Superhomies. In 2022, he was cast as the supporting role in Hulu series This Fool. His performance on the show received mostly positive reviews. His performance was nominated by the Independent Spirit Awards for Best Supporting Performance in a New Scripted Series.

References 

Living people
American comedians
Actors of Mexican descent
Comedians from California
Year of birth missing (living people)